First-seeded Martina Navratilova was the defending champion and won in the final 6–2, 6–3 against Chris Evert.

Seeds
A champion seed is indicated in bold text while text in italics indicates the round in which that seed was eliminated.

  Martina Navratilova (champion)
  Chris Evert (final)
  Gabriela Sabatini (first round)
  Claudia Kohde-Kilsch (first round)
  Mary Joe Fernández (second round)
  Sylvia Hanika (quarterfinals)
  Arantxa Sánchez (first round)
  Raffaella Reggi (semifinals)

Draw

See also
 Evert–Navratilova rivalry

External links
 ITF tournament edition details

Porsche Tennis Grand Prix
1988 WTA Tour